999-year leases in Hong Kong are a rare form of lease in Hong Kong.

History 

They were almost exclusively granted from 1849 to May 1898 on Hong Kong Island and in Kowloon. Some exceptions include Hang Cheong Tai Building (1900), Cheung Ling Mansion (1900), Ka Yue Building (1901), Princeton Tower (1901), Lun Fung Court (1903) and the Consulate General of the United States, Hong Kong and Macau, which was granted a 999-year lease in April 1999. The US Consulate had an option to buy the plot as a freehold in its 1950 lease, but this was eliminated in 1999 in exchange for the 999-year lease.

The only current freehold in all of Hong Kong belongs to St John's Cathedral, which was granted freehold in 1847 with perpetual ownership under the condition that the land be used as a church. The University of Hong Kong had a freehold, which was surrendered in the 1920s in exchange for a 999-year lease.

Some leases were marginally shorter, ranging from 978 to 997 years. In a December 2016 research publication, the Legislative Council said that "At present, only a few pieces of land on the Hong Kong Island and Kowloon are with the lease term of 999 years."

Lots 
Land in Hong Kong is separated into "lots," pieces of land which are leased out by the government. Lots can be further broken down into portions of Sections, Sub Sections, Remaining Portions, and Extensions.

A single building can be erected on one lot or a combination of different lots and portions. As each lot is leased out by the government with its own terms, a single building may therefore sit on land with multiple lease terms. For example, Floral Tower at 22 Robinson Road is built on 3 lots, each with different terms- IL 347: 999 years from 27 November 1849, IL 392: 999 years from 17 March 1855, and IL 717: 999 years from 25 June 1861.

The government provides several tools which can be used to inspect lots:

 Geoinfo Map - a map which displays lots and associated buildings/addresses
 Street Index - a text version of Geoinfo Map
 IRIS - a database where details of each lot (such as terms of length) can be obtained

By using these tools, a lot can be inspected to see if it has a lease of 999 years, and all buildings on those associated lots can be listed- therefore, a list of every building which has a 999 year lease can be generated.

Valuation 
In the 2008 research paper, "Intergenerational Discounting: A Case from Hong Kong" from the University of Hong Kong, researchers found that properties on lots with 999-year leases commanded a premium of 5.74% over similar properties on lots with 99-year leases in the time period from 1992 to 2006.

List of properties 
The below tables are not exhaustive.

Sub 999-year leases 
The following table lists properties in all districts that have sub 999-year leases.

Central and Western District 
The following table lists properties in the Central and Western District that have 999-year leases.

Wan Chai District 
The following table lists properties in the Wan Chai District that have 999-year leases.

Eastern District 
The following table lists properties in the Eastern District that have 999-year leases.

Southern District 
The following table lists properties in the Southern District that have 999-year leases.

Yau Tsim Mong District 
The following table lists properties in the Yau Tsim Mong District that have 999-year leases.

Kowloon City District 
The following table lists properties in the Kowloon City District that have 999-year leases.

See also
 999-year lease

References 

Hong Kong